The Canton of La Côte Salanquaise is a French canton of the Pyrénées-Orientales department, Occitania. At the French canton reorganisation which came into effect in March 2015, the canton was created including 5 communes from the canton of Saint-Laurent-de-la-Salanque and 1 from the canton of Rivesaltes. Its seat is in Saint-Laurent-de-la-Salanque.

Composition 
Le Barcarès
Claira
Pia
Saint-Hippolyte
Saint-Laurent-de-la-Salanque
Torreilles

References

Cote Salanquaise